Great Pretender (stylized as GREAT PRETENDER) is a Japanese original net animation series produced by Wit Studio, directed by Hiro Kaburagi and written by Ryōta Kosawa. The series' arcs are called "cases", and the first case (Los Angeles Connection) was released in June 2020 on Netflix in Japan. The series' first three cases (Los Angeles Connection, Singapore Sky, and Snow of London) were released worldwide on Netflix in August 2020, followed by its fourth case (Wizard of Far East) in November. The series also aired from July to December 2020 on Fuji TV's +Ultra anime programming block.

Characters

Team Confidence

The protagonist, a small-time Japanese con man who aspires to greater things. Hoping to find a good job to pay his ill mother's medical bills, he starts working for a company that he is unaware is engaging in fraud, and is arrested and imprisoned for his involvement. Unable to find honest work after being paroled because of his arrest and the stigma from his father's criminal past, he decides to become a con artist instead. He ends up becoming Laurent's partner after an unsuccessful attempt to con him. He is nicknamed "Edamame" by Laurent, who has difficulty pronouncing his name. He has a fascination with gashapon and buys them at various points in the series.

An expert French con man, renowned for his persuasiveness and quick wit. He grew up in Brussels with his mother Emma Thierry, and he learned several different languages as a child as he aspired to become a diplomat. An investor named Hugo took advantage of Emma's dyslexia, tricking her out of her life savings. One night, Laurent tried to kill Hugo, but ended up stabbing a woman named Dorothy instead whom he later fell in love with. He operates as a gentleman thief, only targeting rich, corrupt people who are a negative influence to society. He uses the scams to expose his targets for their misdeeds, while helping those who were victimized by their targets live honest and happy lives. While ruthless toward his victims, he treats his comrades and associates like a family. He has a flirtatious nature and is a reputed playboy.

An athletic, taciturn woman who is Laurent's second-in-command. Her great physical abilities come in part from her childhood ballet training. Her life changed when Baghdad was bombed, killing her parents and she became a child soldier. She carries a dented medal that she won in a ballet competition as a memento of her parents.

One of Laurent's associates who uses her feminine charms and acting skills to manipulate their targets. Her abilities came from her training to become a stage actress as a young adult.

A Japanese con-man and Edamame's boss for his first job. After being caught by the police, he joins Laurent's gang.

A Korean con-woman and one of Laurent's associates.

Edamame's father. He worked as a lawyer, while secretly working with Laurent's gang. He was arrested for aiding a human trafficking network and that led to Edamame being unable to get a regular job.

Laurent's ex-lover and the leader of the original confidence gang. She was shot on a yacht and fell overboard after a failed confidence game. In the last episode, it is revealed that she is still alive with her memories lost.

Los Angeles

A Hollywood film director who secretly sells drugs.

A bodyguard working for Cassano; his wife died many years before the series events. He has a son named Tom who lives in foster care.

An LAPD detective who has been chasing after Cassano for years. He is corrupt and frequently lets Cassano get away in exchange for bribes. He has a daughter who attends college and studying overseas.

Singapore

An exiled Arab oil tycoon and the organizer of the Pathfinder Air Race.

An ace pilot and Sam's younger brother.

An aerial stunt pilot and former pilot in the United States Military. He was permanently disabled in a previous race with Clark that ended in his plane crashing.

Lewis's wife.

London

An English art appraiser. He pretends to love Farrah, but is only using her for her money so he can buy expensive works of art.

Cynthia's ex-boyfriend, a painter who previously worked for Coleman creating "lost" art works that Coleman would then verify and sell.

A wealthy older woman in love with Coleman.

Farrah's butler.

Tokyo

CEO of Suzaku Association, a corporation that manages trading companies in Tokyo and Shanghai. The corporation is also involved in human trafficking.

Edamame's boss at the Suzaku Association.

A character from the live-action series The Confidence Man JP by the same scriptwriter.

Shanghai

The boss of the mafia Shanghai Longhu-bang that makes their money through human trafficking.

Liu's right-hand man.

Other characters

Edamame's late mother. She encouraged Edamame to keep his morale up since her husband's arrest.

Laurent's late mother. She was dyslexic and died after becoming a scam victim, which eventually led to Laurent becoming a con artist.

Media

Anime

During Anime Expo 2019, Wit Studio revealed announced the 23-episode original anime television series, directed by Hiro Kaburagi, written by Ryōta Kosawa, character designs by Yoshiyuki Sadamoto and music composed by Yutaka Yamada. Yamada also composed its theme song "G.P.", while its ending theme is a cover of the song "The Great Pretender" performed by Queen lead vocalist Freddie Mercury, originally recorded by The Platters.

The series' story is divided into blocks of episodes called "Cases". Case 1: Los Angeles Connection is episodes 1 through 5, Case 2: Singapore Sky is episodes 6 through 10, Case 3: Snow of London is episodes 11 through 14, and Case 4: Wizard of Far East is episodes 15 through 23. Case 1 began streaming on Netflix Japan on June 2, 2020, with Case 2 following on June 9. Case 3 began streaming on Netflix Japan on June 16, 2020, and Case 4 followed on September 21.

The anime series aired on Fuji TV's +Ultra anime programming block and BS Fuji from July 8 to December 16, 2020.

Great Pretender's first 14 episodes were released outside of Japan on Netflix on August 20, 2020, with the last 9 following on November 25.

Manga
A manga adaptation by Daichi Marui began releasing on Mag Garden's Mag Comi and LINE Manga from June 10, 2020. The manga series has been licensed in North America by Seven Seas Entertainment. The series went on hiatus on September 10, 2020 due to Marui's poor health.

References

External links
  at Netflix
Official website 

+Ultra
2020 anime ONAs
2020 anime television series debuts
Anime with original screenplays
Art in anime and manga
Comedy anime and manga
Crime comedy television series
Crime in anime and manga
Fraud in television
Fuji TV original programming
Human trafficking in fiction
IG Port franchises
Mag Garden manga
Netflix original anime
Seven Seas Entertainment titles
Shōnen manga
Television series about illegal drug trade
Television shows set in London
Television shows set in Los Angeles
Television shows set in Shanghai
Television shows set in Singapore
Television shows set in Tokyo
Toho Animation
Wit Studio
Yakuza in anime and manga
Zainichi Korean culture